The Republic of China Navy is the maritime branch of the Republic of China Armed Forces. The ROC Navy's primary mission is to defend ROC territories and the sea lanes that surround Taiwan against a blockade, attack, or possible invasion by the People's Liberation Army Navy of the People's Republic of China. Operations include maritime patrols in the Taiwan Strait and surrounding waters, as well as counter-strike and counter-invasion operations during wartime. The Republic of China Marine Corps functions as a branch of the Navy.

The ship prefix for ROCN combatants is ROCS (Republic of China Ship); an older usage is CNS (Chinese Navy Ship).

ROCN also avoids giving ships hull numbers that add up to or end at "4", as the Chinese pronunciation of the number 4 is close to the pronunciation of "death". This numbering scheme is more apparent on more newly acquired ships.

Note: The ROCN generally uses hull classification symbols similar to the U.S. system with some changes. The proper classification is provided when known.

Present fleet 
In June 2016, two Oliver Hazard Perry-class frigates of the US Navy, ex-USS Taylor (FFG-50) and ex-USS Gary (FFG-51), were handed over to the Government of Taiwan for the Republic of China Navy. The transfer cost was an estimated US$177 million. Following a reactivation period at Detyens Shipyard in Charleston SC, the ships sailed for Taiwan in March 2017 and arrived home in June 2017. The transfer of the ships includes the AN/SQR-19 Multi-Function Towed Array. Taiwan had previously been blocked from acquiring the AN/SQR-19, and the transfer of the system points to an anti-submarine focus in line with the Knox-class frigates they will likely replace.
A new class of eight (8) conventional attack submarines is planned. In November 2020, President Tsai Ing-wen officially opened the submarine construction facility in Kaohsiung, and it is reported (as of November 2021) that the lead submarine is under construction. The Taiwanese military's Indigenous Defense Submarine program anticipate having the first new 2,500-ton domestically produced submarines entering service in the 2023-25 time frame.

Decommissioned ships

Long Chiang-class patrol boats
US designed; based on PSMM MK.5
 ROCS Long Chiang (PG-601) – built by Tacoma Boatbuilding Company
 ROCS Sui Chiang (PG-602) – built by China Shipbuilding Corporation

Hai Ou-class missile boat (Dvora class)
FABG-1~59 (no 4, 13, 22, 31, 40); all were decommissioned by 2013; two were gifted to Paraguay in 1994 and 4 were gifted to Gambia in 2009; replaced by Kung Hua VI project missile boats

PCL-class offshore patrol craft
9 locally designed and built. 143 tons fully load. All decommissioned in 2011.

SX-404-class submarine
Decommissioned in 1973.
 ROCS Hai Jiao (海蛟)
 ROCS Hai Lung (海龍)

Ex United States Navy ships
Chi Yang-class frigate (Knox class)
 ROCS Chi Yang FFG-932 (ex USN FF-1073) retired 2015
 ROCS Hai Yang FFG-936 (ex USN FF-1083) retired 2015

Chao Yang-class destroyer (Gearing class)
World War II era DDs later upgraded to DDGs in three batches, Wu Chin I, II and III. All ships in this class were retired by 2005. 

Wu Chin I Batch: (Retired in 1980s-1990s)
 ROCS Dang Yang DD-11 (ex USN DD-764) 
 ROCS Fu Yang DD-7 (ex USN DD-838)

Wu Chin II Batch:  (Retired in late 1990s)
 ROCS Tse Yang DDG-930 (ex USN DD-873)
 ROCS Han Yang DDG-915 (ex USN DD-833)
 ROCS Kai Yang DDG-924 (ex USN DD-786)
 ROCS Lao Yang DDG-920 (ex USN DD-790)
 ROCS Sheui Yang DDG-926 (ex USN DD-852)

Wu Chin III Batch:  (Retired in 2003–2004)
 ROCS Chien Yang DDG-912 (ex USN DD-787)
 ROCS Liao Yang DDG-921 (ex USN DD-832)
 ROCS Shen Yang DDG-923 (ex USN DD-839)
 ROCS Te Yang DDG-925 (ex USN DD-837)
 ROCS Yun Yang DDG-927 (ex USN DD-718)
 ROCS Chen Yang DDG-928 (ex USN DD-821)
 ROCS Shao Yang DDG-929 (ex USN DD-788)

Benson-class destroyers
 ROCS Luo Yang DD-14 (ex USN DD-421)
 ROCS Han Yang DD-15 (ex USN DD-427)

Gleaves-class destroyers
 ROCS Xian Yang DD-15 (ex USN DD-431)
 ROCS Nan Yang DD-16 (ex USN DD-456)

Fletcher-class destroyer
 ROCS An Yang DD-918 (ex USN DD-521)
 ROCS Qing Yang DD-909 (ex USN DD-528)
 ROCS Gui Yang DD-908 (ex USN DD-540)
 ROCS Kun Yang DD-919 (ex USN DD-541)

Allen M. Sumner-class destroyers
 ROCS Hui Yang DD-906 (ex USN DD-696)
 ROCS Yue Yang DD-905 (ex USN DD-700)
 ROCS Bo Yang DD-910 (ex USN DD-731)
 ROCS Xiang Yang DD-901 (ex USN DD-745)
 ROCS Luo Yang DD-914 (ex USN DD-746)
 ROCS Heng Yang DDG-902 (formerly DD-2, ex USN DD-747)
 ROCS Nan Yang DDG-917 (formerly DD-17, ex USN DD-760)
 ROCS Hua Yang DD-903 (ex USN DD-857)

Ashland-class dock landing ship
 ROCN Zhong Zheng LSD-191 (Dong Hai, ex USN LSD-8)

Casa Grande-class dock landing ships
 ROCN Zhong Zheng LSD-191 (ex USN LSD-19)
 ROCN Zhen Hai LSD-192 (ex USN LSD-22)

Evarts-class destroyer escorts
 ROCS Tai Kang F-21 (ex USN DE-6)
 ROCS Tai Ping F-22 (ex USN DE-47)

Cannon-class destroyer escorts
 ROCN Tai He F-23 (ex USN DE-102)
 ROCN Tai Cang F-24 (ex USN DE-103)
 ROCN Tai Hu F-25 (ex USN DE-104)
 ROCN Tai Zhao F-26 (ex USN DE-112)

Rudderow-class destroyer escorts
 ROCN Tai Yuan F-827 (ex USN DE-579)

Yangtze Patrol gunboats
 ROCN Tai Yuan (ex USN PR-3)
 ROCN Mei Yuan (ex USN PR-4)

PCE-842 class patrol craft
 ROCN Shan Hai PF-41 (ex-Yong Tai, ex USS PCE-867)
 ROCN Wei Yuan PF-42 (ex-Yong Xing, ex USS PCE-869)

Admirable-class minesweepers
 ROCN Zhen Nan (ex-Yong Sheng) PF-43 (ex USN AM-257)
 ROCN Yu Men (ex-Yong Shun) PF-44 (ex USN AM-258)
 ROCN Yang Ming (ex-Yong Ding) PF-45 (ex USN AM-259)
 ROCN Yong Ning PF-46 (ex USN AM-260)
 ROCN Yong Jia PF-47 (ex USN AM-246)
 ROCN Yong Xiu PF-48 (ex USN AM-274)
 ROCN Zi Ling (ex-Yong Shou) PF-49 (ex USN AM-276)
 ROCN Yong Feng PF-50 (ex USN AM-279)
 ROCN Lin Huai (ex-Yong Chang PF-51 (ex USN AM-287)
 ROCN Yong Chun) PF-52 (ex USN AM-363)
 ROCN Yong He PF-53 (ex USN AM-217)
 ROCN Yong Kang PF-54 (ex USN AM-225)
 ROCN Yong Ming (ex USN AM-273)
 ex USN AM-266
 ex USN AM-286

Crosley-class high speed transports
 ROCN Tian Shan 315 (ex USN APD-134)
 ROCN Yu Shan PF-33 (ex USN APD-91)
 ROCN Hua Shan PF-33 (ex USN APD-129)
 ROCN Fu Shan PF-35 (ex USN APD-98)
 ROCN Shou Shan PF-37 (ex USN APD-120)
 ROCN Tai Shan PF-38 (ex USN APD-92)
 ROCN Heng Shan PF-39 (ex USN APD-121)

Charles Lawrence-class high speed transport
 ROCN Wen Shan PF-34 (ex USN APD-42)
 ROCN Lu Shan (ex USN APD-78)
 ROCN Gang Shan PF-42(ex USN APD-43)
 ROCN PF-43 (ex USN APD-48)
 ROCN PF-44 (ex USN APD-76)

Auk-class minesweeper
 ROCN Jian Men PCE-45 (ex USN AM-387)
 ROCN Wu Sheng PCE-66 (ex USN AM-378)
 ROCN Ju Yong PCE-67 (ex USN AM-389)
 ROCN Ping Jing PCE-70 (ex USN AM-118)

PC-461-class submarine chaser
 ROCN Qing Jiang PC-116 (ex USN PC-1168)
 ROCN Xi Jiang PC-120 (ex USN PC-1149)
 ROCN Bei Jiang PC-122 (ex USN Hanford PC-1142)
 ROCN Wu Song  (ex USN PC-490)
 ROCN Dong Ping (ex USN PC-1088)
 ROCN Song Ping (ex USN PC-1090)
 ROCN Gan Tang (ex USN PC-1091)
 ROCN Qian Tang  (ex USN PC-1549)
 ROCN Tuo Jiang PC-104 (ex USN PC-1247)
 ROCN Pei Jiang PC-105 (ex USN PC-492)
 ROCN Xiang Jiang PC-108 (ex USN PC-786)
 ROCN Zi Jiang PC-109 (ex USN PC-1078)
 ROCN Yuan Jiang PC-110 (ex USN PC-1182)
 ROCN Li Jiang PC-111 (ex USN PC-1208)
 ROCN Gong Jiang PC-113 (ex USN PC-1233)
 ROCN Bo Jiang PC-114 (ex USN PC-1254)
 ROCN Chang Jiang PC-115 (ex USN PC-1262)
 ROCN Qing Jiang PC-116 (ex USN PC-1168)
 ROCN Zhu Jiang PC-117 (ex USN PC-1567)
 ROCN Zhang Jiang PC-118 (ex USN PC-1232)
 ROCN Dong Jiang PC-119 (ex USS Placerville PC-1087)
 ROCN Liu Jiang PC-123 (ex USS Escandido PC-1179)
 ROCN Gan Jiang PC-124 (ex USS Vandalia PC-1175)
 ROCN Tuo Jiang PC-125 (ex USS Milledgeville PC-1263)

PGM-9 class gunboat
 ROCN Yin Jiang (ex Bao Ying) PC-101 (ex USN PGM-20)
 ROCN Lin Jiang (ex Dong Ting) PC-102 (ex USN PGM-13)
 ROCN Ou Jiang (ex Hong Ze) PC-103 (ex USN PGM-26)

Infantry landing craft
 ROCN Lian Bi (ex USN LCI-516)
 ROCN Lian Guang (ex USN LCI-517)
 ROCN Lian Rong (ex USN LCI-632)
 ROCN Lian Zhen (ex USN LCI-514)
 ROCN Lian Zhu LCI-261 (ex USN LCI-233)
 ROCN Lian Li LCI-262 (ex USN LCI-417)
 ROCN Lian Shen LCI-263 (ex USN LCI-418)
 ROCN Lian Hua LCI-264 (ex USN LCI-630)
 ROCN Lian Zhen LCI-265 (ex USN LCI-631)
 ROCN Lian Jie LCI-266 (ex USN LCI)
 ROCN Lian Qiang LCI-266 (ex USN LCI-1017)
 ROCN Lian Zhi LCI-271 (ex USN LSSL-81)
 ROCN Lian Ren LCI-272 (ex USN LSSL-56)
 ROCN Lian Yong LCI-273 (ex USN LSSL-95)

Medium Landing ships
 ROCN Mei Shen (ex USN LSM-433)
 ROCN Mei Zhen LSM-341 (ex USN LSM-155)
 ROCN Mei Le LSM-342 (ex USN LSM-157)
 ROCN Mei Yi LSM-343 (ex USN LSM-285)
 ROCN Mei Peng LSM-344 (ex USN LSM-431)
 ROCN Mei Heng LSM-345 (ex USN LSM-456)
 ROCN Mei Hong LSM-346 (ex USN LSM-442)
 ROCN Mei Song LSM-347 (ex USN LSM-457)
 ROCN Mei He (ex Yong Ming) LSM-348 (ex USN LSM-13)
 ROCN Mei Jian LSM-349 (ex USN LSM-76)
 ROCN Mei Hua LSM-350 (ex USN LSM-456)
 ROCN Mei Cheng LSM-351 (ex USN LSM-422)
 ROCN Mei Gong LSM-352 (ex USN LSM-478)
 ROCN Mei Ping LSM-353 (ex USN LSM-471)
 ROCN Mei Wei LSM-354 (ex USN LSM-472)
 ROCN Mei Han LSM-355 (ex USN LSM-474)
 ROCN Mei Le (ex Mei Xin) LSM-356 (ex USN LSM-363)

Tank landing ships
 ROCN Zhong Ye (ex USN LST-717)
 ROCN Zhong Hai LST-201 (ex USN LST-755)
 ROCN Zhong Quan LST-202 (ex USN LST-640)
 ROCN Zhong Ding (ex Zhong Xin) LST-203 (ex USN LST-537)
 ROCN Zhong Xing LST-204 (ex USN LST-557)
 ROCN Zhong Jian LST-205 (ex USN LST-716)
 ROCN Zhong Ji LST-206 (ex USN LST-1017)
ROCN Zhong Cheng LST-207 (ex USN LST-1075)
 ROCN Zhong Xun LST-208 (ex USN LST-732)
 ROCN Zhong Lian LST-209 (ex USN LST-1050)
 ROCN Zhong Rong LST-210 (ex USN LST-574)
 ROCN Zhong Gong LST-213 (ex USN LST-945)
 ROCN Zhong Guang LST-216 (ex USN LST-503)
 ROCN Zhong Zhao LST-217 (ex USN LST-400 Bradley County)
 ROCN Zhong Qi LST-218 (ex USN LST-279 Berkeley County)
 ROCN Zhong Xi (ex Gao Xiong) LST-219 (ex USN LST-735)
 ROCN Zhong Quan (Heng Shan) LST-221 (ex USN LST-1030)
 ROCN Zhong Sheng LST-222 (ex-211, ex USN LST-1033)
 ROCN Zhong Fu LST-223 (ex USN LST-840 Iron County)
 ROCN Zhong Cheng LST-224 (ex USN LST-859 Lafayette County)
 ROCN Zhong Qiang LST-225 (ex USN LST-306)
 ROCN Zhong Zhi LST-226 (ex USN LST-1091 Sagadahoc County)
 ROCN Zhong Ming LST-227 (ex USN LST-1152 Sweetwater County)
 ROCN Zhong Su LST-228 (ex USN LST-520)
 ROCN Zhong Wang LST-229 (ex USN LST-535)
ROCN Zhong Pang LST-230 (ex USN LST-578)
 ROCN Zhong Ye (ex Zhong Xin) LST-231 (ex USN LST-1144 Sublette County)
Repair ships

 ROCN Hsing An (ex USN ARL-41 Achilles)

Ex Royal Navy Ships
Arethusa-class light cruiser
 ROCN Chong Qing (ex RN Aurora)

Flower-class corvette
 ROCN Fu Bo (ex RN K-79 Petunia)

Harbour Defence Motor Launches
 ROCN Fang 1 (ex RN ML-1033)
 ROCN Fang 2 (ex RN ML-1047)
 ROCN Fang 3 (ex RN ML-1058)
 ROCN Fang 4 (ex RN ML-1059)
 ROCN Fang 5 (ex RN ML-1068)
 ROCN Fang 6 (ex RN ML-1390)
 ROCN Fang 7 (ex RN ML-1405)
 ROCN Fang 8 (ex RN ML-1406)

Castle-class corvettes
 ROCN Gao An (ex RN Pembroke Castle)
 ROCN De An (ex RN Nunney Castle)

Ex Royal Italian Navy Ships
Azio-class minelayer
 ROCN Xian Ning (ex Regia Marina Lepanto)

Ex Imperial Japanese Navy Ships
 ROCN An Dong (ex IJN Ataka)
 ROCN Hao Xue (Yong Ji, ex IJN Toba)

Akizuki-class destroyer
ROCN Fen Yang (ex IJN Yoizuki)

Atami-class gunboat
 ROCN Yong Ping (ex IJN Atami)
 ROCN Yong An (ex IJN Futami)

Etorofu-class escort ship
ROCN Lin An (ex IJN Tsushima)
 ROCN Gu An (ex IJN )

Fushimi-class gunboat
ROCN Jiang Feng (ex IJN Fushimi)
ROCN Chiang Hsi (ex IJN Sumida)

Hashidate-class gunboat
ROCN Chang Zhi (ex IJN Uji)

Hiburi-class escort ships
 ROCN Hui An (ex IJN Shisaka)

Kagerō-class destroyers
 ROCN Dan Yang DD-12 (ex IJN Yukikaze)

Matsu-class destroyers
 ROCN Heng Yang (ex IJN Kaede)
 ROCN Hui Yang (ex IJN Sugi)
 ROCN Xin Yang DD-15 (PF-82, ex IJN Hatsuume)
 ROCN Hua Yang (ex IJN Tsuta)

Mikura-class escort ship
 ROCN Zheng An (Xue Feng, ex IJN Yashiro)

Minekaze-class destroyer
 ROCN Shen Yang (ex IJN Namikaze)

No.4-class submarine chaser
 ROCN Min Jiang (Fu Ling) PC-107 (ex Hai Hong, SC-402, ex IJN # 9)

No.13-class submarine chaser
 ROCN Qu Jiang (Yang Long) PC-106 (ex Hai Hong, SC-401, ex IJN # 49)

Seta-class gunboat
ROCN Chang De (ex IJN Seta)

Sokuten-class minelayer (1938)
 ROCN Yong Jing PF-75 (ex IJN Saishū)

Sokuten-class auxiliary minelayer (1913)
 ROCN Jie 29 (ex IJN Kuroshima)

Type C escort ship
 ROCN Rui An (Ying Kou, ex IJN # 67)
 ROCN Huang An (ex IJN # 81)
 ROCN Ji An (ex IJN # 85)
 ROCN Chao An (ex IJN # 107)
 ROCN Chang An (ex IJN # 205)
 ROCN Jie 8 (ex IJN # 215)

Type D escort ship
 ROCN Jie 6 (ex IJN # 14)
 ROCN Cheng An PF-72 (ex IJN # 40)
 ROCN Tai An PF-71 (ex IJN # 104)
 ROCN Jie 12 (ex IJN # 118)
 ROCN Tong An (ex IJN # 192)
 ROCN Wei Hai (ex IJN # 194)
 ROCN Jie 14 (ex IJN # 198)

References

External links
ROCN active duty vessels
ROCN from GlobalSecurity

Taiwan